Alison Sinclair (born 1959) is a British writer of science fiction, resident in Canada. She is the author of the Darkborn trilogy of novels and other works and is a medical doctor.

Selected publications
 Legacies (1995)
 Blueheart (1996)
 Cavalcade (1998)
 Throne Price (cowritten, 2001)
 Darkborn (2009)
 Lightborn (2010)
 Shadowborn (2011)
 Breakpoint: Nereis (2014)
 Contagion: Eyre (2015)

References

External links 

Living people
1959 births
British women medical doctors
People from Colchester
20th-century English medical doctors
English emigrants to Canada
English women writers
English science fiction writers
English fantasy writers
20th-century English women
20th-century English people